Milege Afrojazz Band, commonly known as Milege, is a world music band from Uganda, made up of young talented musicians from Uganda whose enthusiasm is derived from the diverse cultural music traditions of the different tribes of Uganda into which they fuse contemporary elements to express the likeness of Uganda's people in a more current context. As of 2015 Milege's members are; guitarist Manana F. Birabi, vocalist Joanita Katushabe, lead vocalist Gloria Akugizibwe, bassist Paul Owembabazi and violinist Alison Nadunga as a seasoned member.

The band was popularized by their unique signature song Nankasa Zi Wuna and the Milege World Music Festival. The band has also shared stages with some of the biggest names in African music history including Zimbabwean Oliver "Tuku" Mtukudzi, Maurice Kirya from Uganda, Mame N’Diack from Senegal and Uganda's oldest band, Afrigo Band.

On August 12, 2017, Milege won their very first award at Young Achievers Award in a tight race beating The Triplets Ghetto Kids, Eddy Kenzo, Sheebah Karungi and Geosteady in the Creative Arts (Music) category.

History
Milege started in 2009 playing folk traditional Ugandan music using both modern and traditional music instruments. The guitar, the ankle rattles and the traditional drums made the first sounds of the band. The band later managed to acquire more music equipment that enabled it to keep running. 
Milege derives its name from a milégé, a Jopadhola word meaning ankle rattle whose sound symbolizes the coming of the chief or king.
Milege started exploring the beauty of different ethnicities in Uganda by doing music from different regions of the country. They have made music in Luganda, Runyankore, Luo, Karamajong, Lusoga, Lugisu, Kinyarwanda and English. This helped them to achieve one of their goals which was to promote national unity. 
According to Manana F. Birabi, the founding member of Milege, Milege was started up to spearhead the creation of World Class Music rooted in Uganda's cultural heritage
In 2010 Milege Partnered with Uganda Heritage Roots during their Repainting Uganda Tour to head hunt the best original traditional musicians in Uganda. This was aimed at promoting talent and Ugandan culture.
Milege also started up a nonprofit project, Repainting Uganda (described below on this page), which is geared towards promotion of heritage arts. The project headed by Alison Nadunga has fed a number of street children and beggars through mosaic art. Repainting Uganda brings music with fashion, design, art, language, poetry etc.

In 2013 Milege started organizing their own festivals which saw their first ever festival, Repainting Uganda – World Music Festival 2013 sprout at the Lake Victoria Serena Resort. The second festival, Milege World Music Festival 2014 “Repainting Uganda” was held at the Botanical Gardens in Entebbe which became the new home of all the future annual World Music Festivals organized every November.

In 2014 Milege started up a regular acoustic night named Milege Acoustic Project every Thursday at the Makerere University Guest House whose aim was to promote talent, culture and socializing. The Acoustic Project grew to make a thousand plus of attendees every Thursday evening at the Guest House within the first month of the project. University students, staff and the general public make the attendance at the weekly event.

Discography
Milege has majorly done live music on stage. Only one E.P Album was recorded 2010

Albums
Milege released their first studio recorded E.P album in 2010
E.P Intro

Album track list
New Era
Nankasa Zi Wuna
Kankutwale
Agwara
Wafoyo

Unreleased songs
Milege has a number of both recorded and unrecorded songs they perform live which include;

Performances

Milege has toured Africa and other parts of the world performing at corporate events, concerts and festivals including The Inaugural Ceremony of the Rutgers Offices in Uganda at DSW Bonita Training Center in Lubowa alongside Maurice Hasa and Ray Signature, Young Achievers Awards, Repainting Uganda 2010, 2011, 2012, Blankets and Wine, World Music Day, DOADOA, Milege World Music Festival 2013 and 2014 organized by Milege at Lake Victoria Serena Resort, Bayimba International Music Concert, African Jazz Village with Mulatu Astatke, at The Elephant, a regular show hosted by Kenya's Eric Wainaina in Nairobi, Selam in Ethiopia and many more. The success of Ugandan bands including Milege have influenced solo artists such as Cindy, Lilian Mbabazi of The Sundowners, Sarah Zawedde of Zawee Band, Bebe Cool and Gagamel Crew to start up bands.

Nominations and awards

Repainting Uganda
Repainting Uganda, the non-profit arm of Milege was started up in 2013 headed by Alison Nadunga majorly to help street children earn a living through collecting rubbish and teaching them to create and sell mosaic art pieces, a thing that also helped in cleaning the city.

In 2012, through Repaiting Uganda, Milege toured the eastern and northern parts of Uganda under the theme Essence of Colour looking for talented young people that would get education benefits and career promotion in the arts field. Their final show under the then Essence of Colour at the Serena Hotel attracted huge attraction from the media and the photos headlined The Observer newspaper.

Milege Acoustic Project

Milege started up The Milege Acoustic Project in 2014 to mentor aspiring musicians and a place to socialize and support each other.

The band has also provided support to upcoming musicians during their music shows. A number of musicians that have benefited from Milege include; Undercover Brothers Ug , Sitenda both of Tusker Project Fame 6, Jungle, Nawany Catherine, Tracy Birungi and Deborah Kisakye who are now great independent musicians. Other popular talents at the acoustic project include Trizza, Afrie, Kenneth Mugabi from Coca-Cola Rated Next, Brian Malengye, Wush, Haka Mukiga, The Tabs Ug and many others.

Milege gives the acoustic project active members a chance to perform at the Milege World Music Festival stage.

Photo for charity
On 8 August 2015, Milege together with Maurice Kirya's The Sound Cup sponsored a charity event, Photo4Charity where people would take pictures with their favorite celebrities under the theme "Pose for a cause" that happened at The Sound Cup with performances by Milege, Undercover Brothers Ug, Kenneth Mugabi, Haka Mukiga, and many more artists. The event was to raise money to build a house for a homeless widow from Western Uganda with her six, all disabled, children.

Members and professions
Milege has had the longest list of the number of members. Milege members are professionals from different fields most of whom are practicing their professions which is the reason the band has so many past members.

See also
Undercover Brothers Ug
Giovanni Kiyingi
Afrigo Band
Suzan Kerunen
Nsikatila
Sister Charity
Haka Mukiga

References

World music groups
Ugandan musical groups
Musical groups established in 2009
Musical quintets
Indie folk groups